Daniel Hendler (born 3 January 1976) is a Uruguayan film, television, and theatre actor who works mainly in the cinema of Argentina, where he lives. He is known for his starring roles in films such as Bottom of the Sea, Family Law, The Paranoids, Phase 7 and award-winning Lost Embrace by director Daniel Burman, with whom he worked many times. Working on both sides of the Río de la Plata, Hendler achieved international recognition due to his awards as an actor. In 2004, he won the Silver Bear for Best Actor at the Berlin Film Festival for his performance in Lost Embrace. He made his debut as screenwriter and director with the film Norberto's Deadline in 2010. Hendler is part of the generation of actors who revitalized the Uruguayan cinema with films like 25 Watts, and is one of the regular actors of the so-called New Argentine Cinema.

Early life
Born in Montevideo, Uruguay in 1976, Hendler was raised in the neighborhood of Buceo, and also lived in Pocitos, and Cordón. He grew up in a family of Jewish heritage; his father was a merchant and his mother a keen theatergoer. During his youth, Hendler used to play basketball in Hebraica and soccer. He attended the primary Colegio Integral, Hendler said, "I studied in a Jewish school and I feel I went through a phase where I wanted to distance from that environment, to discern better what I was surrounded with, what I wanted to choose and what I didn't from that set of values." Atypically, he had two bar mitzvah ceremonies because his parents were separated since he was five years old. While he's Jewish, he's not religious and does not believe in God. At 14, he began doing theater with some friends.

He was assistant professor and head of drama at the Catholic University of Montevideo. In 1994, he started to train in acting. He, with a number of friends, created the theatre group "Acapara el 522" (Here-stops the 522), a sort of inside joke and pun where the bus line stop in his hometown. They appeared at the "Youth Contest of Theater in Montevideo", competing with over a hundred plays, and won, "Since then, we made five works, of which three were written and directed by me, another by a friend, and the other by Leo Maslíah, who is like a friend of the group," said Hendler. During his time in "Acapara el 522," he was linked with musician and writer Leo Maslíah, with whom he made a literary workshop, adapted one of his stories, and was directed in the play Abulimia. He also made some short films with Pablo Stoll and Juan Pablo Rebella.

Hendler spent almost five years in the University of Architecture of Montevideo, plus some other years of theatrical training. First, he wanted to be an actor, then musician (studied guitar for several years), then architect, but finally decided on acting. One of his first experiences as an actor was in the play Rompiendo códigos.

Among his main influences he mentions Roberto Jones, Roberto Fontana, Walter Reyno, Jorge Bolani, Pablo Stoll, and Juan Pablo Rebella.

Career
In 2001, he won the award for Best Actor for the Uruguayan movie 25 Watts in the Buenos Aires International Festival of Independent Cinema, "It was a very nice prize, maybe the prettiest of all, but I don't know what it meant in my career, maybe nothing. What meant a lot was the movie, having worked in 25 Watts was important for me and my career," said Hendler. In 25 Watts, Hendler plays a youngster from a quiet neighborhood of Montevideo who wanders without a clear direction while at the same time has to study for a test of Italian and has a crush on his tutor. Filmed in 2000 with a very low budget, the film revitalized the Uruguayan film and aided by the awards received in Europe (Best Film at the International Film Festival Rotterdam) marked the beginning of a new stage in the film scene of that country. Almost ten years after its release, Hendler said in an interview, "It was a novelty to see a Uruguayan movie that didn't submit the mate, the Palacio Salvo, and the promenade as a justification for being, was a story of some neighborhood guys."

Although he had already starred in several short and feature films, he became known in Argentina for the ads of Telefónica, a telecommunications company, in 2002, playing Walter, a character by which would be recognized for several years later. Subsequently, Hendler won the Silver Bear for Best Actor in the Berlin International Film Festival for his work in Lost Embrace and Best Actor in the Lleida Latin-American Film Festival for Bottom of the Sea. In Bottom of the Sea (2003), Hendler plays a paranoid architecture student who pursues his girlfriend's psychoanalyst suspecting she's being unfaithful.

Hendler is regular in the Daniel Burman's works. In addition to his brief role in Every Stewardess Goes to Heaven (playing a taxi driver), he has worked in Waiting for the Messiah (2000), Lost Embrace (2004), and Family Law (2005). In those three films his characters are named "Ariel", considered Burman's alter ego; this is most noticeable in Lost Embrace, where Hendler plays a young Jew who research his Polish ancestry to get a passport and emigrate to Europe, as did the director in real life. On the question, Hendler said, "I don't feel I'm Burman's alter ego."

Burman and Hendler met each other in 1998 when the first was visiting Uruguayan theatres with director Marco Bechis looking for an actor for Garage Olimpo. They went to see actor Walter Reyno, and in the same play, entitled The amateur, was Hendler. After Hendler performance, they did a casting in a bar with a digital camera, with Burman playing a Jew and Hendler a Nazi. Finally he didn't get the role for Garage Olimpo, but months later Burman called him to make Waiting for the Messiah.

In 2007, The Paranoids was released with Hendler playing Luciano, a hermit and repressed children's parties entertainer who is based on film's director Gabriel Medina, who met Hendler during the filming of Bottom of the Sea. The New York Times critic Stephen Holden wrote, "Yet for all his infuriatingly neurotic self-sabotage, Mr. Hendler makes Luciano such a lovable loser that you root for him to get over himself." while Boxoffice wrote, "Hendler captures the heart of Luciano's anxieties: his fear of success."

Following The Paranoids, Hendler made his first incursion on television appearing on an episode of the series Mujeres Asesinas ("Killer Women"), and in 2008 was seen on the comedy series Aquí no hay quien viva, playing a lazy janitor named Roman. "I wanted to bring myself to do television and, as time passed, not having traveled that path was increasingly weighing on me," said Hendler in an interview for Clarín.

His first work as writer and director was Norberto's Deadline (2010), about a shy and unemployed salesman named Norberto who start to study acting to gain confidence on himself. As screenwriter, he had previously collaborated on the script for Daniel Burman's El nido vacío (2008). The film was filmed in Uruguay and produced by both countries from the Río de la Plata, "The crew that I chose is my 'dream team'; it's the people I dreamed to work with, beyond nationality, and ended up being a very mixed team, a mixture from Uruguay and Argentina," said Hendler. He had never studied filmmaking before, he says, "Many times we begin with the assumption that the problem of film is on the technical knowledge, but the technical rules are the quickest to learn and the least you use. Experience in the use of certain resources is what gives you the possible solutions or shortcuts at the time of transporting to the screen what you imagined. The more knowledge you have, the easier you reach it, but 'the truths' about cinematic technique are the easiest to solve as a director. There were things I already knew how to do, and some others I didn't, and depend on what you're looking in each movie." By 2003, Hendler had started writing an ensemble story called "The Day Ends at 10," he dismissed the story but the characters were kept for another ensemble film, "The Move", which included a character named Norberto, a role that started to have more and more prominence, until the story finally became Norberto's Deadline.

Daniel Hendler played the character Andrés Goddzer in the 2012 telenovela Graduados, which proved a big success. He received a Tato Award and a Martín Fierro award for his work.

In addition to his work in film and TV, Hendler is also a stage actor, "That's where I think I feel more comfortable, where I feel that you're a real actor. On television and in film, you play to be an actor, but in theatre you're there, with all your implements," he said.

Personal life
Hendler married Argentine film director Ana Katz in 2007, they have since separated. The couple had a daughter, Helena born 2008. He moved from Montevideo to Buenos Aires, and divides his time between Parque Centenario and Montevideo. He hasn't taken Argentine citizenship.

Filmography

Films
 Waiting for the Messiah (2000)
 25 Watts (2001)
 Every Stewardess Goes to Heaven (2001)
 Sábado (2001)
 El Ojo en la Nuca (2001)
 No sabe no Contesta (2002)
 Bottom of the Sea (2003)
 Lost Embrace (2004)
 Whisky (2004)
 Los Suicidas (2005)
 Queens (2005)
 La perrera (2006)
 La Novia Errante (2006)
 Cara de Queso (2006)
 Family Law (2006)
 La ronda (2008)
 The Paranoids (2008)
 Cabeça a prêmio (2009)
 Phase 7 (2011)
 Los Marziano (2011)
 Mi primera boda (2011)
 Between Valleys (2012)
 Vino para robar (2013)
 Edifício Tatuapé Mahal (2014)
 My Friend from the Park (2015)
 Hijos nuestros (2015)
 Al borde (2016)
 El otro hermano (2017)
 Severina (2017)
 The Moneychanger (2019)
 The Sleepwalkers (2019)
 The Intruder (2020)
 Virus-32 (2022)
 El sistema K.E.OP/S (2022)
 Pequeña Flor (2022) 
 Lunáticos (2022)

Television
 Mujeres en Rojo: Despedida (2003)
 Sin código (2004) (uncredited)
 Epitafios (2004) (miniseries)
 Aquí no hay quien viva (2008)
 Mujeres Asesinas (2008)
 Para vestir santos (2010)
 Cuando me sonreís (2011)
 Los únicos (2011)
 Televisión x la inclusión (2011)
 Graduados (2012)
 100 días para enamorarse
 Pequeña Victoria (2019-2020)

Director
 Norberto's Deadline (2010) (written by)

References

External links
 
 

1976 births
Male actors from Montevideo
Uruguayan male film actors
Uruguayan film directors
Uruguayan screenwriters
Uruguayan male stage actors
Uruguayan dramatists and playwrights
Male dramatists and playwrights
Uruguayan male writers
Uruguayan expatriate actors in Argentina
Expatriate male actors in Argentina
Uruguayan people of German-Jewish descent
Jewish male actors
Uruguayan Jews
Living people
Silver Bear for Best Actor winners
20th-century Uruguayan male actors
21st-century Uruguayan male actors
Male screenwriters
Male actors from Buenos Aires
Jewish atheists